Kirwan may refer to:

Places 
 Kirwan, Queensland, suburb in the Australian city of Townsville
 Kairouan, also known as Kirwan, the capital of the Kairouan Governorate in Tunisia

People 
 A. D. Kirwan (1904–1971), former professor, administrator, coach and president of the University of Kentucky
 Annette Kirwan (died 1913), Irish noble
 Barry Kirwan (born 1986), Northern Irish country / folk singer, songwriter and drummer
 Carl Kirwan (born 1991), English rugby union player
 Danny Kirwan (1950–2018), guitarist with Fleetwood Mac from 1968 to 1972
 Dervla Kirwan (born 1971), actress
 Edward Kirwan (1814–1890), English clergyman and cricketer
 Eilis Kirwan (born 1972), Irish filmmaker
 Frances Kirwan (born 1959), British mathematician
 John Kirwan (disambiguation), several persons of this name
 Joseph W. Kirwan (1796–1849), Irish clergyman
 Larry Kirwan (born 1954), musician and playwright best known for his work with Black 47
 Laurence A. Kirwan (born 1952), English doctor
 Laurence P. Kirwan (1907–1999), British archaeologist
 Michael J. Kirwan (1886–1970), congressman, Democrat Ohio 1937–1970
 Richard Kirwan of Galway (1733–1812), prominent philosopher and chemist
 Nicholas Murray (Presbyterian) (1802–1861), Irish-American writer, whose pseudonym was Kirwan
 William Burke Kirwan (born 1814), Irish painter and convicted murderer
 One of the fourteen Tribes of Galway

Other uses 
 Château Kirwan, Bordeaux wine producer, formerly named simply Kirwan

See also